SS Jubilee was the second steamship on Okanagan Lake in British Columbia, Canada, owned and operated by Captain Thomas Shorts. She was built by Shorts and carpenter John Hamilton in 1887 while they were waiting for a new boiler to come in for their first steamship, which needed new machinery. When it arrived, they decided to put the new boiler in the new  by  Jubilee instead and they put Mary Victoria Greenhow's engine in Jubilee as well. She was launched at the Okanagan Landing shipyard at 3:30 p.m. on September 22, 1887. Jubilee took about two weeks per round trip on the lake. A gold strike on Granite Creek in the Similkameen River in 1889 created business for Jubilee and Shorts built a barge to help her. However, the strike didn't last long and the barge was beached. Jubilee was also short-lived, as she froze in ice at Okanagan Landing during a cold spell in the winter of 1889–1890. She sank and in the spring, her machinery was put in Shorts' new barge, City of Vernon. The engine was reinstalled in several more ships, and the retired engine was used in a shingle mill for cutting firewood at Trinity Valley starting in 1906. Finally, Mr. and Mrs. G. H. Worth of Vernon, British Columbia, who had owned and used it for many years, donated it to the Vernon Museum and Archives in November 1957.

See also

References

Culture of the Okanagan
History of British Columbia